Madison Street United Methodist Church is a historic church at 319 Madison Street in Clarksville, Tennessee. The church is a brown brick building that exemplifies Gothic architecture of the Victorian era. It was listed on the National Register of Historic Places in 1976.

It is a fellowship of the United Methodist Church.

History

Prior to the construction of the Madison Street location, worship of the local body of Methodists that would become the congregation of Madison Street UMC commenced in 1831 when the first brick church was constructed on Main Street. This location was later outgrown by the congregation and the fellowship moved to a larger building on Franklin Street. This location was soon outgrown as well, and construction began on the Madison Street church building on September 26, 1882.

This church was established as Madison Street Methodist Church, South. The church fellowship has remained at this location since this date, with various additions being made to the original 1882 structure.

Much of the original structure, including the sanctuary and iconic twin steeples, was destroyed by an F3 tornado which struck downtown Clarksville on January 22, 1999. The church was rebuilt in 2000 by Everton Oglesby Architects who paid homage to the original structure but did not reconstruct the building exactly as it had been pre-1999. Most notably, the steeples were replaced with copper-clad, structural steel outlines of the original towers.

References

Methodist churches in Tennessee
Churches on the National Register of Historic Places in Tennessee
Gothic Revival church buildings in Tennessee
Churches completed in 1882
19th-century Methodist church buildings in the United States
Churches in Clarksville, Tennessee
National Register of Historic Places in Montgomery County, Tennessee